HMS Elizabeth was a 70-gun third rate built at Barnards Yard at Deptford Green by William and Robert Castle of Rotherhithe in 1678/80. She held an active commission during the War of the English Succession fighting in all three major engagements. She was rebuilt at Portsmouth between 1699 and 1704. She was captured by the French off the Scilly Islands in November 1704. She was in the French Navy until she was deleted in 1720.

She was the seventh vessel to bear the name Elizabeth since it was used for a 900-ton (bm) vessel purchased in 1514 and wrecked in 1514.

HMS Elizabeth was awarded the Battle Honour Barfleur 1692.

Construction and Specifications
She was ordered in March 1678 to be built under contract by Robert Castle of Deptford on the River Thames. She was launched on 3 March 1679. Her builder's measure tonnage was calculated as 1,072 tons (burthen).

Her initial gun armament was in accordance with the 1677 Establishment with 72/60 guns consisting of twenty-six demi-cannons (54 cwt, 9.5 ft) on the lower deck, twenty-six 12-pounder guns (32 cwt, 9 ft) on the upper deck, ten sakers (16 cwt, 7 ft) on the quarterdeck and four sakers (16 cwt, 7 ft) on the foc’x’le with four 3-pounder guns (5 cwt, 5 ft) on the poop deck or roundhouse. By 1688 she would carry 70 guns as per the 1685 Establishment . Her initial manning establishment would be for a crew of 460/380/300 personnel.

Commissioned Service

Service 1680-1699
She was commissioned on 18 January 1680 under the temporary command of Captain Tomas Willshaw for delivery to Chatham. In 1688 she was under the command of Captain John Nevill as the Flagship of Rear-Admiral Sir John Berry sailing with Lord Dartmouth's Fleet in 1689. She was under Captain David Mitchell in April 1689 as the Flagship of Admiral Arthur Herbert. She was the Flagship of the English Fleet in the Battle of Bantry Bay on 1 May 1689. She followed this by fighting in the Battle of Beachy Head in Red Squadron on 30 June 1690. Later in 1690 she was under Captain Henry Priestman. In 1692 Captain Stafford Fairborne was in command. She was in the Battle of Barfleur as a member of Red Squadron, Centre Division between 19 and 22 May 1692.

Captain Robert Wilmot was in command in 1693 with the Channel Fleet.  In 1694 she was under Captain Edward Whitaker sailing with Lord Berkeley's operations. In 1695 her commander was Captain James Greenaway sailing with Russel's Fleet. In 1696 she was under Captain John Fletcher sailing in the Soundings. In 1697 she was under the command of Captain Thomas Sherman at Portsmouth. She would be rebuilt at Portsmouth in 1703.

Rebuild Portsmouth 1699-1702
She was ordered to be rebuilt on 25 February 1699 at Portsmouth Dockyard under the guidance of Master Shipwright Elias Waffe. Mr. Waffe left the dockyard in August 1702, and she was completed by Thomas Podd. She was launched/completed on 3 September 1704. Her builder's measure tonnage was calculated as 1,153 tons (burthen). She probably retained her armament as stated in the 1685 Establishment, though it is unclear if her armament was changed to the 1703 Establishment later. It is known that when completed her gun armament total at least 70 guns.

Service 1704
She was commissioned in 1704 under the command of Captain William Cross.

Loss
She was taken by the French 54-gun L’Auguste and Le Jason plus the 26-gun La Valeur of Duguay-Trouin's Squadron off the Isles of Scilly on 12 November 1704 . Captain Cross was dismissed by court martial. She was incorporated into the French Navy until 1720 when she was removed at Brest.

See also
List of ships captured in the 18th century

Citations

References

 Colledge (2020), Ships of the Royal Navy, by J.J. Colledge, revised and updated by Lt Cdr Ben Warlow and Steve Bush, published by Seaforth Publishing, Barnsley, Great Britain, © 2020,  (EPUB), Section K (Kent)
 Winfield (2009), British Warships in the Age of Sail (1603 – 1714), by Rif Winfield, published by Seaforth Publishing, England © 2009, EPUB 
 Lavery, Brian (2003) The Ship of the Line - Volume 1: The Development of the Battlefleet 1650-1850. Conway Maritime Press. 
 Clowes (1898), The Royal Navy, A History from the Earliest Times to the Present (Vol. II). London. England: Sampson Low, Marston & Company, © 1898
 Thomas (1998), Battles and Honours of the Royal Navy, by David A. Thomas, first published in Great Britain by Leo Cooper 1998, Copyright © David A. Thomas 1998,  (EPUB)

Ships of the line of the Royal Navy
1670s ships
Captured ships